Gastón Brugman Duarte (born 7 September 1992) is a Uruguayan professional footballer who plays as a midfielder for  Major League Soccer club Los Angeles Galaxy.

Club career

Early career
Born in Rosario, Uruguay, Brugman began playing football in Peñarol's youth system. He moved to Italy to join Empoli in 2011. He made his debut in Empoli's 0–1 defeat to Modena coming on as 58th-minute substitute replacing Riccardo Nardini.

Pescara and loans
In the summer of 2012 he moved to Serie A club Pescara. The following January he was sent on loan to Grosseto in Serie B. In the 2013–14 season, coach Pasquale Marino made him a regular starter at Pescara, who had been relegated to Serie B. Having further blossomed under coach Serse Cosmi Brugman's play was likened to that of Andrea Pirlo and former Pescara player Marco Verratti. In the summer of 2014 he was close to a transfer to Villareal which, however, was cancelled due to a torn anterior cruciate ligament in his left knee.

Palermo
On 10 July 2015, he moved on loan to Serie A club Palermo, with a buyout clause.

Parma
On 1 August 2019, Serie A side Parma announced the signing of Brugman on a season long loan deal with an obligation to buy.

Loan to Real Oviedo
On 1 September 2021, he joined Spanish club Oviedo on loan.

LA Galaxy
On 6 July 2022, Brugman joined Major League Soccer club LA Galaxy on a three-and-a-half-year contract.

International career
In November 2009 he made his debut for Uruguay U17 in the match against Spain U17, which ended in favor of Spain in a penalty shootout.

Career statistics

Club

References

Living people
1992 births
People from Rosario, Uruguay
Association football midfielders
Uruguayan footballers
Uruguay youth international footballers
Uruguayan expatriate footballers
Peñarol players
Empoli F.C. players
Delfino Pescara 1936 players
F.C. Grosseto S.S.D. players
Palermo F.C. players
Parma Calcio 1913 players
LA Galaxy players
Serie A players
Serie B players
Real Oviedo players
Segunda División players
Expatriate footballers in Italy
Expatriate footballers in Spain
Expatriate soccer players in the United States
Uruguayan expatriate sportspeople in Italy
Uruguayan expatriate sportspeople in Spain
Uruguayan expatriate sportspeople in the United States
Major League Soccer players